Miltonia flavescens, the yellowish miltonia, is a species of orchid occurring in southern Brazil, northeastern Argentina, and Paraguay, and has been reported from eastern Peru.

References

External links 

flavescens
Orchids of Brazil
Orchids of Peru
Flora of Paraguay